3.Pan Arab Games - Casablanca, Morocco - August 1961
Champions

References 

Boxing at the Pan Arab Games